Adventures in Appletown (also known as Hidden Treasure of the Mississippi or The Kings of Appletown) is a 2008 dramedy/adventure film starring twin  brothers Dylan Sprouse and Cole Sprouse, written by Amanda Moresco, directed by Robert Moresco, and produced by Moresco Productions in association with Oak Films. This was the second time the brothers and Victoria Justice worked together, the first time was in an episode of The Suite Life of Zack & Cody called "Fairest of Them All" (Season 1, Episode 2).

Production
It completed principal filming in New Braunfels, Texas and completed post production some time after that.

Story
The film is about two cousins – Will and Clayton – who witness a murder, but out of fear decide not to tell anyone. They and their friend Betsy, whose father has been wrongfully accused of the crime, go on a journey to find the real killer, and at the same time redeem themselves.

Early (limited) release
Adventures in Appletown had a limited preview release on December 12, 2008 and was returned to post production.

On April 13, 2009 the film had a special screening at Loews in Lincoln Square in New York City.  The screening benefited the Joseph Horvath Memorial Scholarship Fund.

The film premiered in Australia on September 13, 2012 on Family Movie Channel on Foxtel and Austar. It released in Australia on DVD early 2013.

Cast 
 Dylan Sprouse as Will
 Cole Sprouse as Clayton
 Victoria Justice as Betsy
 Kate Burton as Mrs. Betta
 Charlie Stewart as Ben (Benny)
Dalton O'Dell as jimmy johnson
 Glenn Taranto as Potter
 Daniel Zacapa as Judge Morgan
Patrick Brennan as Officer Johnson
Sierra Jade Gerban as Faith Ramos
 Malcolm David Kelley as Clifford

Reception
The film received mixed reviews from critics.

References

External links
 
 The Kings of Appleton at Trailerfan
 Production stills at Image Event

2008 films
American adventure films
American coming-of-age films
Films shot in New Braunfels, Texas
2000s English-language films
Films directed by Robert Moresco
2000s American films